Trinity Catholic High School may refer to:

Trinity Catholic High School, Woodford Green, London
Trinity Catholic High School (Connecticut), in Stamford, Connecticut
Trinity Catholic High School (Florida), in Ocala, Florida
Trinity Catholic High School (Kansas), in Hutchinson, Kansas
Trinity Catholic High School (Massachusetts), in Newton, Massachusetts
Trinity Catholic High School (Michigan) in Harper Woods, Michigan
Trinity Catholic High School (St. Louis) in St. Louis, Missouri

See also
Trinity Christian High School (disambiguation)
Trinity High School (disambiguation)
Trinity College (disambiguation)